Raoul Bortoletto (9 May 1925 – 4 January 2003) was an Italian professional footballer who played as a midfielder.

Club career
Bortoletto played for 7 seasons (162 games, 10 goals) in the Serie A for ACF Fiorentina, A.S. Lucchese Libertas 1905 and A.S. Roma.

International career
Bortoletto played his only Italy national football team game on 17 May 1953 against Hungary.

Personal life
His older brother Piero Bortoletto also played football professionally. To distinguish them, Piero was referred to as Bortoletto I and Raoul as Bortoletto II.

External links
 

1925 births
2003 deaths
Italian footballers
Italy international footballers
Serie A players
Serie B players
Treviso F.B.C. 1993 players
ACF Fiorentina players
Empoli F.C. players
S.S.D. Lucchese 1905 players
A.S. Roma players
Cagliari Calcio players
Association football midfielders